Corri English (born Corri Englisby; May 10, 1978) is an American actress.

Life and career 
As a young girl during the late 1980s and early 1990s, she was a frequent host of Kid's Beat and a few other kids shows on TBS (prior to the merger of Turner Broadcasting System with Time Warner), including Feed Your Mind, which she co-hosted with Johntá Austin. She is the singer for country band Brokedown Cadillac.

English was born in Atlanta, Georgia, and graduated summa cum laude from the University of Georgia with a degree in journalism.

She worked with actress Danielle Panabaker twice in 2004—once in Stuck in the Suburbs and later in Searching for David's Heart. She is also a longtime friend of actress Christine Lakin, with whom she produced a short film.

From 2012 to 2013 she starred in the Fearnet on-demand series Holliston. She also co-starred in the same year with Tyler Mane and Traci Lords in Jason Cuadrado's Horror-Thriller film Devil May Call.

She is married to Ty Bentli. They have a son named Radley Mills Bentli, born on June 21, 2013. She gave birth to their second son Sebastian Taylor born in August of 2018.  She then gave birth to their first daughter  Teddi Quinn Bentli born on February 2, 2021.

Awards and nominations
In 2006 she won a Horror Award at the International Horror and Sci-Fi Film Festival for Best Actress for Unrest. English was seen in Ryan Little's 2007 thriller film House of Fears as Samantha. The movie was released on DVD March 9, 2010.

Filmography
 Space Ghost Coast to Coast (1 episode, "Sequel", 1999) .... Galaxy Girl
 Shake, Rattle and Roll: An American Love Story (1999) (TV) ....
 Dawson's Creek (1 episode, "The Anti-Prom", 2000) .... Barbara Johns
 Going to California (1 episode, "A Little Hard in the Big Easy", 2002) .... Joanne
 Runaway Jury (2003) .... Lydia Deets
 Joan of Arcadia (2 episodes, "The Election" and "Queen of the Zombies", 2004–2005) .... Elizabeth Goetzman
 One Tree Hill (1 episode, "Spirit in the Night", 2004) .... Claire Young
 No Witness (2004) .... Britney Haskell
 Stuck in the Suburbs (2004) (TV) .... Jessie Aarons
 Searching for David's Heart (2004) (TV) .... Jayne Evans
 3: The Dale Earnhardt Story (2004) (TV) .... Kelley Earnhardt
 RedMeansGo (2005) .... Lucy
 Without a Trace (1 episode, "Requiem", 2006) .... Amy Jordano
 The Bedford Diaries (8 episodes, 2006) .... Natalie Dykstra
 Unrest (2006) .... Alison Blanchard
 CSI: Miami (1 episode, "Going Under", 2006) .... Angela Downey
 Justice (2 episodes, "Shot to the Heart" and "Christmas Party", 2006) .... Kelly Wright
 Campus Ladies (1 episode, "Barri & Joan Rush a Black Sorority", 2007) .... Sorority Girl
 NCIS (1 episode, "Friends & Lovers", 2007) .... Lisa Delgado
 House of Fears (2007) .... Samantha
 Winter Tales (2007) TV mini-series .... Shannon / Tim / Mom / Rachel (voice)
 Killer Pad (2008) .... Jezebel
 The Tiffany Problem (2008) .... Tiffany Hane
 Broken Windows (2009) .... DJ
 Mrs. Washington Goes to Smith (2009) .... Zoe
 Hellcats (1 episode, Season 1-Episode 11: "Think Twice Before You Go.", 2010) .... Brokedown Cadillac, singer Corri English
 House M.D. (2012).....Kayla
 Holliston .... Corri - April 12, 2012 -
 Devil May Call (2013) .... Samantha "Sam" Carvin
 Planes: Fire & Rescue (2014) .... Pinecone (voice)

Voice over

Video games
 Dragon Age: Origins (2009) .... Rica, Cocky Female Elf voice type
 Dragon Age: Origins - Witch Hunt (2010) .... Arianne
 The Elder Scrolls V: Skyrim (2011) .... Jarl Elisif the Fair, Brelyna Maryon and other characters
 Mass Effect 3 (2012) .... Additional voices
 Final Fantasy Type-0 HD (2015) .... Sice
 Fallout 4: Nuka-World (2016) .... Shelbie Chase (DLC)
 Titanfall 2'' (2016) .... Ion OS

References

External links
 
 Brokedown Cadillac's official website

1978 births
Living people
20th-century American actresses
21st-century American actresses
Actresses from Atlanta
American child actresses
American film actresses
American television actresses